Cambarus veitchorum, the White Spring cave crayfish, is a small, freshwater crayfish endemic to Limestone County, Alabama in the United States. It is a cave-dwelling species known from only one cave, the White Spring Cave. 

It is considered Critically Endangered (Possibly Extinct) by the IUCN Redlist, having not been seen since 1968. A survey carried out in 2007 of its home cave and 26 other caves failed to find any specimens.

References

Cambaridae
Cave crayfish
Freshwater crustaceans of North America
Crustaceans described in 1997
Endemic fauna of Alabama